New York's 109th State Assembly district is one of the 150 districts in the New York State Assembly. It has been represented by Patricia Fahy since 2013.

Geography 
District 109 is in Albany County. It contains the western portion of the city of Albany and the towns of Bethlehem, New Scotland and Guilderland.

Recent election results

2022

2020

2018

2016

2014

2012

References 

109
Albany County, New York